"Golden" is a song by the American singer and rapper Travie McCoy featuring the Australian recording artist Sia. It was released digitally as a single on June 15, 2015, by Fueled by Ramen.

In an interview with Entertainment Weekly, McCoy said, "I think 'Golden' is a cog in the machine that is the next album. Every song has its own shape and sound in order to make the machine move and work the way I want it to."

Background
In an interview with Entertainment Weekly online, McCoy said he had met Sia four years before and that he had been a fan of hers for years. "When we finally [met] we were totally kindred spirits. We had both gone through a lot and she became a sister to me very quickly. [...] This was probably the third of about three or four that we've recorded together. Who knows if the others will ever be heard, but they all mean so much to me. She actually wrote a song for me when I was going through some really hard times that I will always hold dear to my heart. She's an angel with the voice of one." Speaking on Entertainment Tonight, McCoy said, "It's like second nature working with Sia. We have this brotherly-sisterly vibe going on. Once I heard the hook, I kinda knew where I wanted to go lyrically and I wrote it in about 45 minutes... I think a lot of people can relate to having those tinglies in their stomach about that special somebody."

Video
The video for "Golden" was premiered on YouTube on 14 June 2015 and is inspired by an iconic traffic shot in Jean-Luc Godard's 1967 cult classic film Week-end. The video is a continuous looping shot of Travie leaving his car on a desert road and observing the eccentric passengers in the vehicles in front of him.

Charts

Weekly charts

Certifications

Release history

References

2015 singles
2015 songs
Fueled by Ramen singles
Sia (musician) songs
Song recordings produced by Diplo
Songs written by Diplo
Songs written by Sia (musician)
Songs written by Travie McCoy
Travie McCoy songs
Male–female vocal duets